This is a list of banks in Slovenia, correct as of 18 October 2022.

Central bank

Banka Slovenije

Commercial and retail banks

Savings banks

Hranilnica LON d.d., Kranj  - national identification number: 60, BIC: HLON SI 22
Delavska hranilnica d.d., Ljubljana  - national identification number: 61, BIC: HDEL SI 22
Hranilnica in posojilnica Vipava d.d.  - national identification number: 64, BIC: KHVI SI 22

Defunct bank
Slovenska investicijska banka d.d. (in liquidation procedure)
Sberbank Banka d.d. (acquired by NLB Group and becomes N Banka)

References

 
Banks
Slovenia
Slovenia